St. George Antiochian Orthodox Church may refer to:

St. George Antiochian Orthodox Church (Lowell, Massachusetts)
St. George Antiochian Orthodox Church (Montreal)
St. George Antiochian Orthodox Church (Orlando, Florida)

See also
St. George's Cathedral, London, an Antiochian Orthodox Church in England